David Benjamin Deacon (10 March 1929 – 23 July 1990) was a professional footballer who played in the Football League as a full back for Ipswich Town. He also played non-league football for Bungay Town and Cambridge United.
His brother Jimmy was a Council member of the Suffolk County FA.

References

1929 births
1990 deaths
People from Broome, Norfolk
English footballers
Association football defenders
Bungay Town F.C. players
Ipswich Town F.C. players
Cambridge United F.C. players
English Football League players